Claro Duany Yedra (August 12, 1917 – March 28, 1997) was a Cuban professional baseball player. He played from 1944 to 1952.

References

External links
 and Seamheads
Negro League Baseball Players Association

1917 births
1997 deaths
New York Cubans players
Industriales de Monterrey players
Sherbrooke Athletics players
Rojos del Águila de Veracruz players
Diablos Rojos del México players
Tampa Smokers players
Havana Cubans players
Cuban expatriate baseball players in Canada
Cuban expatriate baseball players in Mexico
Cuban expatriate baseball players in the United States
People from Caibarién
Cuban expatriate baseball players in Nicaragua